Rowlings is a surname of English and Irish origin. Notable people with the surname are:

Barry Rowlings (born 1950), Australian footballer
Ben Rowlings (born 1996), British paralympic athlete
Stephen Rowlings (born 1976), English snooker player

See also
Rollings
Rowling (disambiguation)

References

English-language surnames
Surnames of Irish origin